Hem Barua (Assamese: হেম বৰুৱা) was a prominent Assamese poet and politician from Assam.

Early life
Born on 22 April 1915, at Tezpur, Hem Barua obtained his M.A. degree from Calcutta University in 1938 and joined the J.B. College, Jorhat, in 1941 as lecturer in Assamese and English. He left it next year during the Quit India Movement and was imprisoned in 1943. On his release, he joined the B. Barua College, Guwahati, and later became its Principal.

Literary career
Hem Barua was the author of several books. He became the President of the Asam Sahitya Sabha in its annual session held at Dhubri in 1972 and was regarded as one of the pioneers of modern literary movement in Assam.

Political career
Hem Barua left the Congress in 1948 and became a member of the Socialist party. Later he was elected as the National Executive of the Praja Socialist Party. He was elected to the Lok Sabha from Gauhati in 1957, 1962 and 1967 and from Mangaldoi in 1967. He was the member of the Lok Sabha till December 1970.

Works
 Adhunik Sahitya (1948)
 Sagar Dekhicha? (1954)
 Balichanda (1959)
 San Mihali (1958)
 Cupid Aru Psyche (1959)
 Ranga Karabir Phul (1959)
 Kannaki (1960)
 Ei Git (1961)
 Idle Hours (1962)
 Assamese Literature (1962)
 Sahitya Aru Sahitya (1962)
 Achuphul (1964)
 Man Mayuri (1965)
 Bahagate Pati Jaon Biya (1969)
 Smritir Papari (1970)
Some more books written by Hem Barua are,
 Talxora(Assamese) 
 Dak Pokhili(Assamese)ghuj
 Mekong Noi Dekhilu(Assamese)
And the most important of them all, a book on all the ethnic communities and the tribes of North-East India is,_
 The Red River & the Blue Hill in English(1954)

See also
 Assamese literature
 History of Assamese literature
 List of Asam Sahitya Sabha Presidents
 List of Assamese writers with their pen names
 List of hem barau books wrtten in assamese

References

Scholars from Assam
Assamese-language poets
People from Tezpur
Asom Sahitya Sabha Presidents
1915 births
1977 deaths
India MPs 1957–1962
India MPs 1962–1967
Poets from Assam
University of Calcutta alumni
People from Sonitpur district
Praja Socialist Party politicians
Lok Sabha members from Assam
20th-century Indian poets
Indian National Congress politicians from Assam
India MPs 1967–1970